Harold G. Fowler was a National Park Service landscape architect.

His works include:
Ash Mountain Entrance Sign, North of Three Rivers in Sequoia National Park, Three Rivers, California, NRHP-listed 
Cabin Creek Ranger Residence and Dormitory, Generals Highway in Sequoia National Park, southeast of Wilsonia, California (National Park Service: landscape architect Harold G. Fowler; Emergency Conservation Work landscape architect Lloyd Fletcher), NRHP-listed

He was one of two Principal Landscape Architects of the Generals Highway, following Merel S. Sager in that role.

He assessed the possibility of opening what became the Hidden Valley ski area.

References

American architects
Year of birth missing
Year of death missing